The Organist Entertains was a long-running music programme broadcast on BBC Radio 2. The 30 minute programme focused on the organ in its many guises, and played recordings and live broadcasts of theatre organs, pipe organs and electronic organs around the United Kingdom and the rest of the world. 

The programme ran as a weekly feature on Radio 2 from 11 June 1969 and was originally presented by Robin Richmond. In 1980, Nigel Ogden took over as presenter. In Ogden's absence, the programme was occasionally guest presented by Blackpool Tower organist Phil Kelsall. The programme's introductory music was "From This Moment On" by Cole Porter, played by Ogden.

On 10 January 2018, the BBC announced that the programme was to be discontinued after being on air for almost half a century. The final programme was broadcast on 8 May 2018.

References

External links

BBC Radio 2 programmes
British music radio programmes
Organs (music)
1969 radio programme debuts
2018 radio programme endings